The 2020 Canadian Mixed Curling Championship was held from November 3 to 9, 2019 at the Foyer des loisirs et de la culture in Jonquière, Saguenay, Quebec.

Quebec won the event, having gone undefeated throughout the tournament. It was only the second championship for La Belle Province. Quebec skip Jean-Sébastien Roy had home ice advantage as a native of Jonquière.

Teams
The teams are listed as follows:

Round robin standings
Final Round robin standings

Round robin results

All draws are listed in Eastern Time (UTC−04:00).

Draw 1
Sunday, November 3, 6:30 pm

Draw 2
Monday, November 4, 2:00 pm

Draw 3
Monday, November 4, 7:00 pm

Draw 4
Tuesday, November 5, 9:30 am

Draw 5
Tuesday, November 5, 2:00 pm

Draw 6
Tuesday, November 5, 7:00 pm

Draw 7
Wednesday, November 6, 9:30 am

Draw 8
Wednesday, November 6, 2:00 pm

Draw 9
Wednesday, November 6, 7:00 pm

Placement round

Seeding pool

Standings
Final Seeding Pool Standings

Results

Draw 10
Thursday, November 7, 9:30 am

Draw 11
Thursday, November 7, 2:00 pm

Draw 12
Thursday, November 7, 7:00 pm

Draw 13
Friday, November 8, 9:30 am

Draw 15
Friday, November 8, 7:00 pm

Championship pool

Standings
Final Championship Pool Standings

Results

Draw 11
Thursday, November 7, 2:00 pm

Draw 12
Thursday, November 7, 7:00 pm

Draw 14
Friday, November 8, 2:00 pm

Draw 15
Friday, November 8, 7:00 pm

Playoffs

Semifinals
Saturday, November 9, 9:30 am

Bronze medal game
Saturday, November 9, 2:30 pm

Final
Saturday, November 9, 2:30 pm

References

External links

Mixed Curling Championship
Canadian Mixed Curling Championship
Canadian Mixed Curling Championship
Canadian Mixed Curling
Curling in Quebec
Sport in Saguenay, Quebec